Flierl is a German language surname. Notable people with the name include:
 Brigitte Flierl (1956), German speed skater
 Bruno Flierl (1927), German architect, architecture critic, and writer
 Glenn Flierl (1948), Researcher, oceanography
 Hans Flierl (1885–1974), German jurist and local politician
 Johann Flierl (1858–1947), German pioneer Lutheran missionary in New Guinea
 Jule Flierl (1982), German artist and actress
 Markus Flierl (1971), Researcher, computer science

References 

German-language surnames